Muhammad Abbas, (born 16 February 1986) is a Pakistani alpine skier who was his nation's first competitor at the Winter Olympic Games, in 2010. Muhammad Abbas was not expected to win any medal, but he outraced some of the other debuting skiers. A group said to be particularly interested were Pakistani Canadians.

Abbas was raised in a small village in Northern Pakistan, and his first pair of skis were carved out of wood by his father. He was discovered at age 8 by a Pakistani Air Force officer (Group Captain(R) Zahid Farooq) who remains his coach. Abbas works for the Air Force, his assignment being to ski.

Career

2010
In the 2010 Winter Olympics he competed in the Men's Giant Slalom event. Out of the 103 skiers he finished 79th with a time of 1:38.27 in the first run and 1:42.31 in the second run, for a total time of 3:20.58, which was 42.75 seconds off the pace.

2011
Abbas participated in the 2011 South Asian Winter Games held in India in January.

See also
 Pakistan at the 2010 Winter Olympics

References

External links

1986 births
Living people
Pakistani male alpine skiers
Olympic alpine skiers of Pakistan
Alpine skiers at the 2010 Winter Olympics
Alpine skiers at the 2003 Asian Winter Games
Alpine skiers at the 2007 Asian Winter Games